Paul Burgan Weisz (July 2, 1919–September 25, 2012) was a Czechoslovak-born American chemist, noted for his work on solid catalysts which had a major impact on petroleum refining.

Life
Weisz was born July 2, 1919 in Plzeň, Czechoslovakia, the son of Alexander and Amalia Weisz: they moved to Berlin and finally emigrated to the United States in 1939.
He married, and was survived by his wife, Rhoda, and his son, Randy and daughter, Ingrid.
He died September 25, 2012 in State College, Pennsylvania.

Education
Weisz studied physics at the Technical University of Berlin and then at Alabama Polytechnic Institute where he received a B.S. degree in 1940. He took a sabbatical from work and gained a doctorate at ETH Zurich in 1966.

Work
Weisz produced 91 US patents and more than 180 papers, many related to diffusion behavior, which he applied to solid catalysts, dyeing and movement of chemicals in cells.

Early career
While studying in Berlin, he also worked on Geiger counter instrumentation and cosmic ray measurements at the Institute of Cosmic Radiation Research.  After graduating in the USA, he carried out further work in these fields at the Bartol Research Foundation of the Franklin Institute and was seconded to MIT helping to develop a long-range radio navigation system, LORAN.  He also taught part-time at Swarthmore College.

Mobil
In 1946 he joined Mobil as a Research Assistant, turning his attention to diffusion and catalysis, eventually rising to become Manager of the Central Research Laboratory, and staying there until his retirement in 1984.  It was there that he carried out the work which made him most famous, the development of shape-selective catalysts which revolutionized many petroleum refining and chemical processes.  A 1960 paper, "Intracrystalline and Molecular-Shape-Selective Catalysis by Zeolite Salts", coauthored with Vince Frilette, a Mobil colleague,  became the foundation of shape-selective catalysis (which accelerated certain chemical reactions, but only for molecules of particular shape) and one of his most widely cited papers. Processes based on this and subsequent work were first commercialized in the early 1960s.

The company permitted him a sabbatical period from 1964 to 1966 at ETH Zurich, where he earned a doctorate setting the foundation for some of the fundamental laws of diffusion in dyeing.

Academic career
From 1974 to 1976 he was a visiting professor at Princeton University. From 1983 he was a distinguished professor of chemical and bio-engineering at the University of Pennsylvania.  From 1993 he was an adjunct professor in chemical engineering at Pennsylvania State University.  In this period he applied chemical and physical principles to biomedical research, including work with Madeleine M. Joullié on the synthesis of a molecule equivalent to heparin which avoided the dangerous side-effects of the natural molecule.

Honors
1972 E. V. Murphree Award in Industrial and Engineering Chemistry, American Chemical Society
1974 Pioneer Award, American Institute of Chemists
1977 Leo Friend Award, American Chemical Society
1977 Elected member, US National Academy of Engineering for “Contributions in pioneering the use of molecular sieves as cracking catalysts for petroleum hydrocarbons.”
1978 R. H. Wilhelm Award, American Institute of Chemical Engineers
1980 Honorary Doctorate (ScD, technological science), ETH Zurich
1983 Lavoisier Medal, Société Chimique de France
1983 Langmuir Distinguished Lecturer Award, American Chemical Society
1985 Perkin Medal, Society of Chemical Industry
1986 Chemistry of Contemporary Technological Problems Award, American Chemical Society
1987 Carothers Award, American Chemical Society
1988 DGKM Kollegium Award (Germany)
1992 US National Medal of Technology and Innovation "For his basic discoveries and management in the field of zeolite catalysis, in conjunction with his colleagues at Mobil Corporation, leading to chemical and petroleum technologies now producing products valued at billions of dollars per year."

See also
Weisz–Prater criterion

References

1919 births
2012 deaths
20th-century American chemists
Auburn University alumni
ETH Zurich alumni
Scientists from Plzeň
National Medal of Technology recipients
Czechoslovak emigrants to the United States
Fellows of the American Physical Society